The Port of Longview is a deep-water port authority located in Longview, on the Columbia River in southwest Washington, United States. It was established in 1921 by Washington state law, and operates as a unit of local government. The port is overseen by a locally elected, three-member board of commissioners. Each commissioner is elected for a six-year term and is directly responsible to the voters for port operations.

The Port manages and operates a marine terminal complex where domestic and international ships and barges arrive and depart, and bulk, break bulk and project cargos are loaded or unloaded by local labor union workers. Union workers operate lifting and moving equipment including cranes, forklifts and reach stackers. These workers belong to the International Longshore and Warehouse Union Local 21.

Transportation routes connecting to the Port include the Columbia River shipping channel, the BNSF Railway and Union Pacific railroads, and north–south Interstate 5, the main highway running from Mexico to Canada.

The Port also leases industrial land and contributes financially towards recreational projects in Cowlitz County.

Mission
To promote commerce and economic development through strategic public investments for the benefit of our communities.

Location
The Port of Longview is located 66 river miles inland from the Pacific Ocean on the deep-draft Columbia River shipping channel.  It is approximately 120 driving miles from Seattle, Washington and 40 miles from Portland, Oregon. The Port district occupies the northern two-thirds of Cowlitz County, from just north of Kalama, Washington to the Lewis County line.

Transportation

Rail
The BNSF Railway and Union Pacific railroad main lines run parallel to Interstate 5 approximately five miles from the Port. The Longview Switching Company switches trains from the railroad main lines into the Port. From there, Port locomotives move trains and rail cars to the marine terminals and industrial locations.

Highway
The Port is located approximately three miles from north-south Interstate 5, the main roadway stretching from Mexico to Canada.

Facilities

Facilities include eight marine terminals (docks), covered and uncovered warehouses, and open storage areas for temporary storage of cargo prior to loading on trucks, specialized trailers or rail cars.

Bridgeview Terminal (Berth 1 & 2) – export bulk facility for agri-products, chemical, and minerals
Berth 4 – bulk loading terminal available for redevelopment
Berth 5 – Petroleum coke export facility operated by the Port for BP
Berth 6 – general cargo berth handling steel, wind energy, forest products and project cargo
Berth 7 – general cargo, barge loading and import bulk terminal
Berth 8 – multi-purpose dock handling general cargo, project cargo, forest products and steel
Berth 9 – bulk export facility, Export Grain Terminal

Types of cargo

Dry Bulk: petroleum coke, potash, soda ash, soya meal, talc, bentonite clay, other
Break bulk: steel, logs
Project: wind turbine components (towers, blades, nacelles), electrical generators, oversize components for industrial and manufacturing applications

History

In 1911, the state of Washington enacted laws allowing people to establish port districts and elect commissioners to administer those districts and oversee their development and operation. In 1921, the Port of Longview was established by a vote of the people residing within the local port district boundary (northern two-thirds of Cowlitz County, from just north of Kalama to the Lewis County line). Originally established as the Port of Kelso, the Port was later changed by a vote of the people, to the Port of Longview, because a state law required ports to be named after the largest city within the district.

Original cargo activity consisted of forest products (logs and lumber) exports to Asia. These exports began to decrease in the 1980s, and today are no longer handled by the Port. To replace log cargos, the Port now handles steel, bulk and project cargos.

Commissioners and managers

Commissioners
T. D. Dungan - 1921-24
D. M. Atkins - 1921-24
Elias Holbrook - 1921-24
R. H. Barr - 1925-33
Andrew Schwarz - 1924-24
E. W. Ross - 1924-24
Frank Dallam, Jr. - 1934-35
Jess Schwarz - 1925-26
Charles H. Olson - 1925-30
W. C. Nikolaus - 1935-40
J. Perry Burcham - 1927-32
Luke L. Goodrich - 1930-50
Walter S. Talbott - 1940-42
A. A. Byrnes - 1933-40
M. R. Couch - 1950-53
N. F. Anderson - 1942-44
George H. Umbaugh - 1940-69
H. I. Quigley - 1953-69
Roy Taylor - 1944-55
James S. Baker - 1969-75
Ralph G. Nolte - 1969-89
William Graham - 1955-62
Roy G. Dennis - 1976-81
M. E. Norman - 1962-73
Floyd V. Carpenter - 1982-87
Richard F. Olson - 74-78
Jerry Nestaval - 1988-93
Larry M. Larson - 1978-2007
J. Walter Barham - 1990-07
Daniel J. Buell - 1994-2011
Roger Allen - 2007-2007
Darold Dietz - 2007-2015
Bob Bagaason - 2007–2018
Lou Johnson - 2012-2015
Doug Averett - 2015–present
Jeff Wilson - 2016–present
Allan Erickson - 2018–present

Managers
H. L. Tabke - 1925-27
Frank Gowdy - 1927-43
Harvey Hart - 1943-73
Bob McNannay - 1973-86
Brian Fladager - 1986-87
Ken O'Hollaren - 1988-2012
Geir-Eilif Kalhagen - 2012-2016
Norman G. Krehbiel - 2016 - 2020
Dan Stahl - 2020 interim

See also
American Association of Port Authorities

Gallery

Further reading
International Logistics, Donald F. Wood....[et al.], 2nd ed., (2002),  (AMACOM), New York, NY, 9. Seaports, Airports, Canals, and Tunnels, p. 226. Fig. 9-1 Longview, Washington

References

External links
Port of Longview (official website)
Washington Public Ports Association (official website)

Ports and harbors of Washington (state)
Longview, Washington